Brandon Escobar (born 25 September 1990 in Long Island, New York) is a Honduran American wrestler. He largely grew up on Long Island and briefly attended Suffolk County Community College. He qualified to wrestle in the men's freestyle events at the 2012 Summer Olympics for Honduras. He was their first Olympic wrestler. He lost to Mihran Jaburyan in the second round of the men's -55 kg freestyle division.

He taught wrestling to kids and adults at the UFC Gym in Sunnyvale CA.

References 

Living people
1990 births
American people of Honduran descent
People from Long Island
Wrestlers at the 2012 Summer Olympics
Honduran male sport wrestlers
Olympic wrestlers of Honduras